Wilhelm Ladewig (8 October 1906 – 20 July 1979) was a German athlete. He competed in the men's decathlon at the 1928 Summer Olympics.

References

1906 births
1979 deaths
Athletes (track and field) at the 1928 Summer Olympics
German decathletes
Olympic athletes of Germany
People from Gryfice County